Periscelis is a genus of flies in the family Periscelididae. There are about 15 described species in Periscelis.

Species
These 15 species belong to the genus Periscelis:

 Periscelis annectans Sturtevant, 1963
 Periscelis annulata (Fallen, 1813)
 Periscelis annulipes Loew, 1858
 Periscelis chinensis Papp & Szappanos, 1998
 Periscelis fasciata Mathis, 1993
 Periscelis flinti (Malloch, 1915)
 Periscelis heegeri (Duda, 1934)
 Periscelis kabuli Papp, 1988
 Periscelis kaszabi Papp, 1988
 Periscelis nebulosa Hendel, 1913
 Periscelis nigra (Zetterstedt, 1860)
 Periscelis occidentalis Sturtevant, 1954
 Periscelis schulzei Duda, 1934
 Periscelis wheeleri (Sturtevant, 1923)
 Periscelis winnertzii Egger, 1862

References

Further reading

 

Periscelididae
Articles created by Qbugbot
Opomyzoidea genera